Jeremy Tyler Trueblood (born May 10, 1983) is a former American football offensive tackle of the National Football League (NFL). He played college football at Boston College and was drafted by the Tampa Bay Buccaneers in the second round of the 2006 NFL Draft.

Trueblood was also a member of the Washington Redskins and Atlanta Falcons.

Early years
Trueblood attended Cathedral High School in Indianapolis, where he was a classmate and teammate of fellow 2006 NFL draftee Mathias Kiwanuka. Kiwanuka was also his classmate and teammate at Boston College. At Cathedral, he received all-city and all-state awards in 1998, 1999 and 2000. He also helped lead his team to back to back state championships.

College career
Trueblood played college football at Boston College from 2002 to 2005. He started 36 games during that span. He majored in communications.

Professional career

2006 NFL Draft
At the NFL Scouting Combine Trueblood ran a time of 5.25 seconds in the 40-yard dash.

Tampa Bay Buccaneers
Trueblood was drafted by the Tampa Bay Buccaneers in the second round of the 2006 NFL Draft.

Washington Redskins
Trueblood signed with the Washington Redskins on March 14, 2013. On August 27, 2013, the Washington Redskins terminated Trueblood's contract.

Atlanta Falcons
Trueblood signed with the Atlanta Falcons on September 3, 2013.

References

External links
Tampa Bay Buccaneers bio
Boston College Eagles bio

1983 births
Living people
American football offensive tackles
Boston College Eagles football players
Tampa Bay Buccaneers players
Washington Redskins players
Atlanta Falcons players